Ian Bannon (born 3 September 1959) is a former English footballer who played as a central defender for Rochdale. He also played non league football for Clarence, Oswestry Town and abroad for Newcastle Rosebud United.

References

Living people
Rochdale A.F.C. players
Oswestry Town F.C. players
Adamstown Rosebud FC players
1959 births
Footballers from Bury, Greater Manchester
English footballers
Association football defenders